Agnar Sandmo (9 January 1938 – 31 August 2019) was a Norwegian economist at the Norwegian School of Economics (NHH). He made a series of important contributions in the study of disparities, redistribution, insurance arrangements and tax systems.

He has written and published many economic articles throughout his career. From 1976 to 1980, he was a member of the Petroleum Price Board of the Swedish Government's Economic Commission and, from 1996 to 1997, of the Government Committee on Priorities in Health Care. He served as chairman of the Government Expert Committee on Investment Policies of the Petroleum Fund in 2004. Sandmo was affiliated with the SNF, a prominent research firm, he mainly did work on public economics and taxation. His research is not limited to but includes the overarching fields of economics of uncertainty, public economics, environmental economics and the history of economic thought. His articles have appeared in many prominent Economic journals. He had various positions, such as honorary doctor, at various universities.

Awards, fellowships
Fellow, Econometric Society
Member of the Royal Swedish Academy of Sciences.
Member of the Norwegian Academy of Science and Letters.

References

External links
 Professor Sandmo's homepage
 Press release: Professor Agnar Sandmo wins Møbius 2002

1938 births
2019 deaths
21st-century  Norwegian economists
20th-century  Norwegian economists
Academic staff of the Norwegian School of Economics
Fellows of the Econometric Society
Members of the Royal Swedish Academy of Sciences
Members of the Norwegian Academy of Science and Letters
Foreign associates of the National Academy of Sciences